Rafi Adar (born 1946) is an Israeli chef. He was a judge on MasterChef Israel's first season, but was dismissed during the shoots. He owned the Pronto restaurant, considered by some to be the best Italian restaurant in Tel Aviv, handing it over to new management in March 2017. On Pronto's 21st birthday, he published a book on it with recipes. Media has covered some of his comments that elicited outrage.

In addition to being a chef, he is also a film-maker, and has filmed the only Israeli film on boxing.

References

Living people
1946 births
Israeli chefs